Patrick Gamper (born 18 February 1997) is an Austrian cyclist, who currently rides for UCI WorldTeam . In October 2020, he was named in the startlist for the 2020 Giro d'Italia.

Major results

2014
 National Junior Road Championships
1st  Time trial
1st  Road race
2015
 1st  Time trial, National Junior Road Championships
2016
 1st Stage 6 Tour de Serbie
2017
 3rd Raiffeisen Grand Prix
 6th Time trial, UEC European Under-23 Road Championships
2019
 1st  Time trial, National Under-23 Road Championships
 1st Gran Premio Industrie del Marmo
 1st Stage 2 Giro del Friuli-Venezia Giulia
 2nd Poreč Trophy
 3rd Duo Normand (with Matthias Brändle)
 9th Kattekoers 
2020
 2nd Time trial, National Road Championships
2021
 National Road Championships
3rd Road race
5th Time trial
2022
 2nd Road race, National Road Championships

Grand Tour general classification results timeline

References

External links

1997 births
Living people
Austrian male cyclists
People from Kufstein District
Sportspeople from Tyrol (state)